Leslie Blair Lewis (3 September 1926 – 20 April 2002) was an  Australian rules footballer who played with St Kilda in the Victorian Football League (VFL).

Notes

External links 

1926 births
2002 deaths
Australian rules footballers from Victoria (Australia)
St Kilda Football Club players